The 28th Edition of Star Awards 2023 (Chinese: 红星大奖2023) is a television award ceremony that honoured the best in Singaporean television released between January and December 2022. Star Awards 2023 prepares for the largest celebration of local Chinese entertainment industry talent and content in Singapore! The Star Awards 2023, with the theme "Beyond | Celebrations," have been redefined as a star-studded concert, bringing together the best performers from Singapore and the region for an exhilarating night of glitz, excitement, and celebrations unlike any other. The Ceremony will once again be held at Marina Bay Sands, Singapore on 9 April 2023.

The current All-Time Favorite Artiste Felicia Chin and Rebecca Lim earned their tenth Top 10 Most Favorite Artiste awards, in last years' ceremony, making Rebecca Lim the ninth celebrity to receive the Top 10 honour for ten consecutive years.

The Nominees of the professional categories were announced on 15 February 2023, on Me Watch official website. 

This year's show will also include an international host —— Taiwanese Singer, Matilda Tao and Lee Teng will first being collaborated as the host of the ceremony, while Lee Teng will get to host the 3rd time after the 2016 and 2017 ceremony.

Telecast

Schedule

Winners and nominees
Brandon Wong is the only actor this year that is being nominated for both the Best Actor and Best Supporting Actor honours in the same year. This is Richie Koh's, Desmond Ng's and Ayden Sng's first nomination in the Best Actor category, which is now emphasising young actors. For the first time since the 2001 ceremony, Huang Biren and Zoe Tay will contend for the Best Actress Award in the same division.

The same genre and television programme for which Quan Yi Fong previously won in 2021 and 2022, "Hear U Out," is still up for nomination this year.  Quan Yi Fong previously dominated in the category of "Best Programme Host," she has already surpassed all other candidates and winners in the category.

One of the first-time nominees Das DD, is the first ever artiste of Indian origin in Singapore to receive a nomination at the Star Awards.

Star Awards has been nominated at least 25 times and has won 10 out of 25 times in the Variety Special Category, making the event with the most nominations and wins.

The majority of the nominations for Best Radio Programme are the same as last year, with only one new and qualified nominees to compete in this category. The Breakfast Quartet gets the most victories in this category for the second year in a row since a new category was formed in 2021.

Awards 
Winners are listed first and highlighted in boldface.

Special awards 
This is given to an artist who has received a total of ten "Top 10 Most Popular Male / Female Artiste Awards" and/or "Most Popular Rising Star Award," which do not have to be consecutive. The artiste will receive an All-Time Favourite Artiste Award after winning the tenth popularity award.

Popularity Awards

Top 10 Most Popular Artistes 十大最受欢迎男女艺人

Artists who meet the Popularity Category Eligibility Criteria are shortlisted to participate in a nationwide poll of 1,000 people from Singapore's population, with an equitable breakdown across various age groups ("Popularity Survey") and public voting.

An recognized market research business conducts the Popularity Survey independently using face-to-face or door-to-door questionnaires.

The public vote for the popularity awards will begin in March 2023. 

The Top 10 Most Popular Male / Female Artiste Awards and Most Popular Rising Stars Awards are selected by the findings of the Popularity Survey (20%) and public vote (80%), which are validated by experienced auditors.

Top 3 Most Popular Rising Stars 三大最受欢迎潜力星
Mediacorp added another popularity poll award this year, "Most Popular Rising Star Award". Participants must be newcomers with no more than 5 years of performing arts experience. This year, 39 newbies were chosen as finalists. The award is gender neutral and can be awarded to both male and female artistes. The top 3 vote-getters will get trophies.

MyPick! Categories
A minor award ceremony called MyPICK! which had been presented second consecutive year since 2022. 

The public voted to select the winners of the MY PICK! categories. Voting began at 12:00 p.m. on March 6, 2023. Voting was free and open to all voters having a valid meCONNECT account. Each voter could only vote once every day in each award category. The results will be unveiled on April 9, 2023, during the Star Awards 2023 - Backstage Marathon.

Sponsorship Voting Category

Nominations

Winning category obtained are marked with bold.

Presenters and performers
The following presented awards and performed musical numbers.

Changes to award categories
There will be a new category called "Most Popular Rising Star Award 最受欢迎潜力星," which will have the same eligibility requirements as the Top 10 Most Popular Artistes, with a nominee having to play at least a lead role or main host in at least one Eligible Programme, or a supporting role or episodic host in at least one Eligible Programme. Nominees must have 5 years or fewer of professional screen acting and/or screen / audio hosting experience (as at 1 January 2022). Cameo appearances and/or experiences prior to the age of 18 are not considered professional screen acting and/or screen / audio hosting experience. Also, the "Best Rising Star Award" will be judged by the professional juries.
The Best Short-Form Drama Series 最佳短篇戏剧 category was not presented first time this year since its inception in 2019.
The amount of nominations for the Top 10 Most Popular Artistes has now been increased to an unlimited number, making any artiste who have contributed to Singapore television eligible to compete in The Top 10.

References

External links

2023
Impact of the COVID-19 pandemic on television
2022 in Singaporean television